The JMF Elite Forces is a special forces unit in Malaysia placed under the responsibility of the Royal Johor Military Force (JMF) with the mandate of providing security and protection to the Royal Family of Johor, counter-terrorism and special reconnaissance in any incidents involving the state of Johor.

History 
After returning to Johor from his services with the Indian Army in December 2007, Tunku Ismail Idris, the prince of Sultan Ibrahim Ismail, wants to remodel the JMF roles similar to the Vatican Swiss Guard.

The JMF elite unit was established on 7 July 2008, by Tunku Ismail, who at that time was the JMF 2nd Staff Operations Officer and Training. He felt the need for a specific doctrine in JMF organisations to establish a special force capable of performing certain tasks efficiently. The establishment was also intended to provide the best personal security protection to the Johor Royal family.

To realise the objective, Tunku Ismail and 20 officers and members from JMF were trained in the selection of counter-terrorism courses by the Malaysian Army Grup Gerak Khas for three months at Fort Iskandar, Mersing, Johor. The courses were conducted with technical assistance and expertise provided by the Yankee Alpha Squadron of 22nd Commando Regiment and include the basic knowledge and specific skills appropriate to their duties as a special close protection to the Sultan of Johor Royal family.

Organisation 
The JMF Elite Forces establishment has several objectives, including identifying the best members of the JMF to participate in special teams and making them competent to perform specific tasks and develop self-esteem and level of JMF military discipline either on or off duty. The establishment seeks a friendly relationship with other Malaysian Special forces to share experiences and knowledge that will indirectly enhance existing professionalism. Tunku Ismail has the vision to see the establishment of the Elite Forces based on the JMF goals he outlined. One of them is making this a team that is able to perform the duties and responsibilities effectively, and the establishment of this as a springboard for the modernisation of the existing JMF service.

Duties and responsibilities 
The JMF Elite Forces have a different range of duties to the regular JMF unit. Their duties include:

 Keeping the security and protection of the Johor royal family, especially the Sultan of Johor, Sultanah of Johor, Prince and Princess of Johor and the Johor royal family who received the title.
 To act as a VIPs escort to dignitaries and VIP guests, especially among the Johor royalties.
 Implementation of privacy and confidentiality of operations that are necessary from time to time.
 Being tactical deploy units that can respond at any time.
 To act as a unit furtherance to the JMF.
 Being an observer in the work of special intelligence and reconnaissance.
 Combating terrorists who commit violence in the area of responsibility and hostage rescue movement can be made if necessary.

JMF Elite Forces are mandated to provide close protection duties for the following people:

 The Sultan of Johor, former and current
 The Sultanah of Johor, former and current
 Princes and princesses of Johor
 Other Royal families of Johor
 The Head Minister of Johor
 Foreign VIPs such as heads of states, ambassadors, etc.

Selection and advanced training 
The selection only accessible to the current JMF troops. The sultan also encourages them to try for the JMF Elite Forces in their early 20s so they can stay fit for the special forces unit. Candidates will be tested with two Physical Fitness Test before sent to the Basic Commando Course at the Special Warfare Training Centre (PULPAK). The first two tests are conducted internally by JMF Elite Forces operators and its attrition rate is 90%.

Physical Fitness Test 

The test involves obstacle courses and much running.

Advanced Physical Fitness Test 

All candidates and current members are required to go through the Advanced Physical Fitness Test. Current members are obligatory to maintain the same fitness as standardised by the JMF Elite Forces. Fail to do so, current members will be dropped from the unit. After the test, the Platoon Leader then will decide which candidate will undergo the Basic Commando Course with the Malaysian Army.

The test includes:

 Camp stage:
Obstacle course
Fitness training
Combat training
Unarmed combat training
 City Stage:
 daytime run
Final Stage:
 speed march in  full battle gear under 3 hours.

Basic Commando Course (12 weeks) 

Lasts for three months, JMF Elite Forces candidates will be attached to the Malaysian Army and trained by the PULPAK. The graduation is done with Malaysian Army commando traditions. Graduates will receive green beret, light blue lanyard and the commando knife. The elite forces candidates will return to the JMF and receive JMF Elite Forces badges as a symbol of being accepted into the JMF Elite Forces.

Advanced Training 

JMF Elite Forces members will be sent to Sri Iskandar Camp, Mersing to receive advanced training, also known as Special Forces Specialist Course, from the 22nd Commando Regiment and PULPAK. Some of the advanced course offered includes:

 Special infiltration and reconnaissance course
 Sniper course
 Close quarters combat
 Combat diving
 Counter-terrorism
 Counter-sniper tactics
 Marksmanship
 Sabotage
 Combat search and rescue
 Fighting in built-up areas
 Hostage rescue
 Military operations on urbanized terrain
 Close protection
 Special demolitions
 Explosive ordnance disposal

Identities 
The uniforms of the JMF are standardised to all of the JMF units. The JMF Elite Forces commandos wore the uniform and beret same as the regulars. However, there are few accessories that separate them from the regulars.

JMF Elite Forces skill badge

The gold JMF Elite Forces skill badge is given to the members after they graduate from the Basic Commando Course. The badge is worn on the left breast pocket on their service dress while the black and olive version is used on their combat uniform.

Light blue lanyard

The light blue lanyard is inherited by the Malaysian Special Service Unit (MSSU; now known as 21 Grup Gerak Khas – 21 GGK) from the 40 Commando, Royal Marines. In the present day Malaysia, the light blue lanyard is the symbol of commando-trained and widely used by the commandos from Malaysian Army 21 GGK and Royal Malaysian Air Forces PASKAU. The light blue lanyard also was be given to the commando-trained JMF soldiers after they finished the Basic Commando Course at the Special Warfare Training Centre (PULPAK).

Elite Forces shoulder tab

The yellow 'Elite Forces' embroidered on black background version is worn on the left shoulder at service dress and black on olive version is worn on combat uniform.

Weapons and equipment
Weapons

: Glock 17
: SIG Sauer P226
: Remington 870
: CZ Scorpion Evo 3
: Brügger & Thomet MP9
: Heckler & Koch MP5
: Colt M16A4
: SIG SG 553 SOW
:  Accuracy International Arctic Warfare

Equipment

SPECTRA helmet
Blackhawk Tactical Vest Type IV
Nomex battle dress uniform
 Magnum Stealth II tactical boots

See also 
 Royal Johor Military Force
 Elite Forces of Malaysia

References

Counterterrorist organizations
Special forces of Malaysia
Counterterrorism in Malaysia
Protective security units
Military units and formations established in 2008